Max Casella (born Maximilian Deitch; June 6, 1967) is an American actor. He is known for his roles on the television series Doogie Howser, M.D., The Sopranos, Boardwalk Empire, Vinyl, Cro and the voice of Daxter in the Jak and Daxter video game series.

Early life
Casella was born in Washington, D.C., the son of David Deitch, a newspaper columnist, and Doris Casella, a social worker. His father is Jewish and his mother is of Italian descent. He grew up in Cambridge, Massachusetts and attended Cambridge Rindge and Latin School, where his classmates included Traci Bingham, Ben Affleck, and Matt Damon. Max has Growth hormone deficiency, which accounted for his ability to play characters much younger than his actual age. His brother also shares the condition. He didn't go through puberty until the age of 27 after medical intervention (which he still takes). His physical changes caused him to gain weight and he was dropped by his agents. He then had to completely reinvent himself as an actor.

Career
Casella played Vincent "Vinnie" Delpino in the television series Doogie Howser, M.D. from 1989 to 1993 with Neil Patrick Harris. In 1992, Casella played Racetrack Higgins in Newsies, which was based upon true events in the 1899 newsboys strike against Joseph Pulitzer and William Randolph Hearst. He appeared in WindRunner: A Spirited Journey, starring Margot Kidder and Russell Means as Jim Thorpe's ghost. In 1997, Casella played Timon in the original Broadway production of The Lion King; a performance for which he was awarded a Theatre World Award and received a Drama Desk Award nomination. From 2000 to 2001 he returned to Broadway as Marcellus Washburn in the revival of The Music Man. Casella portrayed Pvt. Dino Paparelli in Sgt. Bilko. He joined the cast of the HBO series The Sopranos during its third season, as Benny Fazio. Casella also starred in Ed Wood and Analyze This. In 2007, Casella portrayed Dick Howser in the ESPN mini-series The Bronx is Burning. He also voiced Tip in The Little Mermaid II: Return to the Sea, Zini in the CGI film Dinosaur and the titular character in ABC's Cro. In 2008, Casella played Mack Steiner in Leatherheads and Dennis, one of the main characters in Scaring the Fish. He also played Leo D'Alessio in season one of the HBO series Boardwalk Empire.

Personal life 
Casella married Leona Robbins in 2002, and has two daughters, Mia and Gioia. They lived in New York City; and they separated in 2018.

Filmography

Film

Television

Video games

References

External links

Max Casella at Home Box Office

1967 births
Living people
20th-century American male actors
21st-century American male actors
American male child actors
American male film actors
American male television actors
American male video game actors
American male voice actors
American people of Italian descent
American Ashkenazi Jews
Cambridge Rindge and Latin School alumni
Jewish American male actors
Male actors from Cambridge, Massachusetts
Male actors from New York City
Male actors from Washington, D.C.
Singers from Massachusetts
Theatre World Award winners
21st-century American Jews